is a railway station in the city of Ichinoseki, Japan, operated by East Japan Railway Company (JR East).

Lines
Yamanome Station is served by the Tōhoku Main Line, and is located 448.0 rail kilometers from the terminus of the line at Tokyo Station.

Station layout
The station has two opposed side platforms connected to the station building by a footbridge.  The station is unattended.

Platforms

History
Yamanome Station opened on 8 April 1928. The station was absorbed into the JR East network upon the privatization of the Japanese National Railways (JNR) on 1 April 1987. A new station building was completed in May 2011.

Surrounding area
 Yamanome-machi Post Office

See also
 List of Railway Stations in Japan

References

External links
 
  

Railway stations in Iwate Prefecture
Tōhoku Main Line
Railway stations in Japan opened in 1928
Ichinoseki, Iwate
Stations of East Japan Railway Company